Lick Skillet is an unincorporated community in Smyth County, Virginia, United States.  According to local legend, Lick Skillet's name is derived from the roads around the community which form the appearance of a skillet.

References

Unincorporated communities in Smyth County, Virginia
Unincorporated communities in Virginia